"History" is a song by Blue System. It is the first track on their 1993 eighth studio album, Backstreet Dreams, and was released as its lead single around a month prior.

The single debuted at number 48 in Germany for the week of April 5, 1993, peaking at number 26 two and four weeks later.

Composition 
The song is written and produced by Dieter Bohlen.

Charts

References

External links 
 

1993 songs
1993 singles
Blue System songs
Hansa Records singles
Songs written by Dieter Bohlen
Song recordings produced by Dieter Bohlen